Japhet Manzambi Tanganga (born 31 March 1999) is an English professional footballer who plays as a defender for  club Tottenham Hotspur.

Early life
Tanganga was born in Hackney, Greater London, to a Congolese family. He attended Greig City Academy and, at the age of 10, joined the Tottenham Hotspur youth academy.

Club career
In June 2019, Tanganga had his contract with Tottenham extended until 2020. On 24 September 2019, he made his debut in the EFL Cup away to Colchester United.  On 11 January 2020, Tanganga made his full Premier League debut in a 1–0 home defeat against Liverpool. Three days later he played the full 90 minutes against Middlesbrough in a FA Cup replay, which Spurs won 2–1 and was named man of the match.

On 27 July 2020, Tanganga signed a new contract with Tottenham, valid until 2025. However, he suffered from a series of injuries, and apart from a EFL Cup game against Chelsea in September, did not play any games from March 2020 when League football was suspended due to the COVID-19 pandemic until 26 November 2020 in the UEFA Europa League match against Ludogorets Razgrad. Following his return from injury, he made few appearances in the remainder of the season.

On 16 August 2021, Tanganga started Tottenham's first game of the 2021–22 season, and was named man of the match in a 1–0 victory against Manchester City. In the September game away against Crystal Palace in the Premier League Tanganga received two yellow cards in quick succession and was sent off when the game was 0–0. Tottenham lost the game 3–0.

Tanganga was ruled out for the remainder of the 2021–22 season after he suffered a knee injury on 24 January 2022 in a 2–0 loss to Chelsea. He made 19 appearances in the season with 11 of them coming in the league.

International career
Tanganga has represented England youth levels at under-16, 17, 18, 19 and 20.

In 2014, Tanganga represented the England under-16 team against Scotland in the Victory Shield. In 2017, he took part in the Toulon Tournament and was a second-half substitute in the final as England defeated Ivory Coast to retain their title.

Tanganga also played at the 2018 UEFA European Under-19 Championship and scored in their opening group game against Turkey.

Although also eligible to represent DR Congo, Tanganga stated in May 2020 that he intended to pursue an international career with England, saying: "In life you have to have goals and one of my goals is to be capped at senior level for England".

On 2 October 2020, Tanganga received his first call up to the England U21 squad  but withdrew on 5 October 2020 due to injury. Tanganga eventually made his U21 debut during the second game of England's 2021 UEFA European Under-21 Championship campaign, a 2–0 defeat to Portugal on 28 March 2021.

Style of play 
Tanganga is a versatile defender, comfortable both as a central defender and as a right back. He describes his approach as "aggressive," saying that "great players their talent can really hurt you. So my strategy is to make sure I get after him. Don’t give him any time, don’t give him the opportunity to get the head up and pass because he has the quality to do that."

Career statistics

Honours
Tottenham Hotspur
EFL Cup runner-up: 2020–21

England U20
Toulon Tournament: 2017

References

External links

Profile at the Tottenham Hotspur F.C. website

1999 births
Living people
Footballers from Hackney, London
English footballers
England youth international footballers
England under-21 international footballers
Association football defenders
Tottenham Hotspur F.C. players
Premier League players
Black British sportspeople
English sportspeople of Democratic Republic of the Congo descent